William M. Coughlan (1899 – July 5, 1952) was an American college football player and track athlete and coach. He played football and ran track at Sewanee: The University of the South and was inducted into the school's sports hall of fame in 2005. Coughlan was a halfback and quarterback on the Sewanee Tigers football team and captain of the 1920 squad. He returned an interception 70 yards for a touchdown against Alabama in 1922. He was second-team on the all-time Sewanee football team. Coughlan coached track at the University of Chattanooga in 1930, and later coached at Notre Dame prep.

References

1899 births
1952 deaths
American football halfbacks
American football quarterbacks
Chattanooga Mocs track and field coaches
Sewanee Tigers football players
Sewanee Tigers men's track and field athletes
Sportspeople from Chattanooga, Tennessee
Players of American football from Tennessee